Karim Khodapanahi (born 1944) is an Iranian politician. He was the foreign minister of Iran between 1980 and 1981.

Biography
Khodapanahi was born in 1944. He served as the minister of foreign affairs from 3 August 1980 to 11 March 1981 in the cabinet led by Prime Minister Mohammad-Ali Rajai. He replaced Sadegh Ghotbzadeh in the post. Mohammad-Ali Rajai succeeded Khodapanahi as acting foreign minister.

References

External links

20th-century Iranian politicians
1941 births
Freedom Movement of Iran politicians
Foreign ministers of Iran
Iran's Book of the Year Awards recipients
Living people